This page lists the rosters of the 2022 BAL season, the inaugural season of the Basketball Africa League (BAL). Each team features 13 players. On the rosters, a maximum of four foreign players is allowed including maximum two non-African players. One player from the BAL Elevate program, a cooperation with the NBA Academy Africa, is placed on each team.

Sahara Conference

AS Salé

Abdelali Lahrichi and Ousmane Drame were added ahead of the playoffs.

DUC

US Monastir
From the past season, six players returned for their second BAL season. On May 11, Monastir signed Julius Coles Jr. ahead of the playoffs.

In

Teams in italics also play in the 2022 BAL season.

Out

Ferroviário da Beira

SLAC

SLAC acquired two players with previous BAL experience, as Chris Crawford played (US Monastir) and Josh Nzeakor (AS Police) appeared in the 2021 season. Crawford left the team after the group phase; Oumar Barry and Malcolm Griffin joined the team ahead of the playoffs.

Transactions
Teams in italics also play in the 2022 BAL season.

In

Out

REG

In May, Kenny Gasana and Abdoulaye N'Doye joined the team ahead of the playoffs; they replaced Pitchou Kambuy Manga and Store Habimana as active players on the roster.

Nile Conference

Cape Town Tigers

The following is the Cape Town Tigers roster for the group phase of the 2022 BAL season. On May 4, Cleanthony Early joined Cape Town for the playoffs.

Cobra Sport

Espoir Fukash

FAP

 Ahead of the playoffs, Charles Minlend Jr. and Abou Diallo joined the team; they replaced Pierre Tankoua and Ebaku Akumenzoh.

Petro de Luanda

 On May 8, 2022, Petro signed E. C. Matthews to join the team for the 2022 BAL Playoffs.

Zamalek

On May 9, 2022, Mohab Yasser signed with Zamalek ahead of the playoffs.

References

rosters